Seal of the Pharaoh is a video game developed by ASK Kodanosha Co. / System Sacom and published by Panasonic for the 3DO.

Gameplay 

Seal of the Pharaoh is a first-person game of dungeon exploration.

Synopsis

Development and release

Reception 

Next Generation reviewed the game, rating it two stars out of five, and stated that "The instruction book helpfully supplies maps to the first four levels, but there's not a lot of variance to the scenery no matter how deep you delve, and its brightly lit corridors reveal a total lack of atmosphere or any distinctive style. It's competent, but no better."

References

External links 
 Seal of the Pharaoh at GameFAQs
 Seal of the Pharaoh at MobyGames

1994 video games
3DO Interactive Multiplayer games
3DO Interactive Multiplayer-only games
Action role-playing video games
Dungeon crawler video games
Video games developed in Japan
Video games set in Egypt